Villepot is a commune in the Loire-Atlantique department in western France.

Geography
The river Verzée flows eastward through the southern part of the commune.

See also
Communes of the Loire-Atlantique department
The works of Jean Fréour Works in the Notre Dame de l’Assomption church in Villepot.

References

Communes of Loire-Atlantique